Dandelion Paddock was a first-class cricket ground in Dent de Lion west of Margate, Kent. Sir Horatio Mann organised a number of matches there in the 1790s.

Location
The estate was established around a former manor house in the 12th or 13th century by the family of Dent de Lyon. It was owned by Charles James Fox for many years until his death in 1806. The only remaining evidence of the estate is a 15th-century gatehouse.

Matches
The grounds had been converted into a resort and tea garden by the time cricket matches were held there and had become very popular with residents of Margate and nearby Ramsgate.

The earliest known match at Dandelion Paddock was in September 1789 when Mann's East Kent XI played a team from the Isle of Thanet. In September 1795, it became a first-class venue when Mann staged three successive matches featuring his own XI. Two further games took place in 1796.

The ground is last known to have been used on 15 September 1806 when Lord Frederick Beauclerk's XI defeated Edward Bligh's XI by 53 runs. Kent also used the New Cricket Ground in Cliftonville to the east of Margate for one first-class match in 1864.

References

1789 establishments in England
Cricket grounds in Kent
Defunct cricket grounds in England
Defunct sports venues in Kent
English cricket venues in the 18th century
History of Kent
Margate
Sports venues completed in 1789